Today! is the second studio album, but third body of work recorded by folk/country blues musician Mississippi John Hurt. It was released in 1966 by Vanguard Records. This album contains some of the first commercial material recorded after his "rediscovery" in 1963, and is the first he recorded for Vanguard. The album spans several genres and styles of music, ranging from traditional blues and folk songs, to country, to African-American spirituals. Along with Hurt's two previous releases, Today! helped to reveal his work to a wider folk audience. In 2009, the album was one of the twenty-five selections that were added to the Library of Congress' National Recording Registry.

Background and recording 
Hurt had made commercial recordings for the now-defunct Okeh Records in 1928; these did not sell well, and he drifted back into obscurity in southern Mississippi. In 1952, Harry Smith's Anthology of American Folk Music, which contained two tracks by Hurt, was released. As well as this, a man had discovered a copy of Hurt's "Avalon Blues", which gave the name of Hurt's home town, Avalon, Mississippi. In 1963, Tom Hoskins and Richard Spotswood, two folk enthusiasts, located him in Avalon using the song. Hoskins convinced him to move to Washington, D.C., where there would be plenty of opportunities to perform to an increasing folk audience. There, he made his first post-war recordings, which were released on the Gryphon label as Folk Songs and Blues.

Hurt was invited to perform at the Newport Folk Festival in 1963, where he was greeted as a "living legend". Following this performance, he began to tour around various universities, and recorded a second album in 1964. Through touring, Hurt's audience continued to grow, which prompted a recording contract with Vanguard Records and the release of his third album, Today!, in 1966. A similar recording and performance schedule was adopted by the fellow bluesman Skip James around this same time, who also recorded for Vanguard an album of the same name.

Reception 

David Freedlander, of Allmusic, writes this of Today!:

Track listing 
All songs written by Hurt, except when noted
Side one 
"Pay Day"
"I'm Satisfied"
"Candy Man"
"Make Me a Pallet on the Floor" (trad.)
"Talking Casey"
"Corrina, Corrina" (trad.)

Side two
"Coffee Blues"
"Louis Collins"
"Hot Time in the Old Town Tonight" (trad.)
"If You Don't Want Me Baby"
"Spike Driver Blues" (trad., arranged John Hurt)
"Beulah Land" (trad.)

Personnel 
 Mississippi John Hurt – guitar, vocals

See also 
 Today! (Skip James album)
 The Lovin' Spoonful, a band whose name was inspired by the song "Coffee Blues"

References 

1966 albums
Vanguard Records albums
United States National Recording Registry recordings
Mississippi John Hurt albums
United States National Recording Registry albums